Rochefort-sur-Loire (literally Rochefort on Loire) is a commune in the Maine-et-Loire department in western France.

Geography
The commune is traversed by the river Layon.

See also
Communes of the Maine-et-Loire department

References

Rochefortsurloire